Aggad is an Arabic surname. Notable people with the surname include:

Omar Aggad (1927–2018), Saudi Palestinian businessman
Tarek Aggad (born 1971), Saudi businessman

See also
 Aggadah

Surnames of Arabic origin